Nancy E. Dunlap  is a physician, researcher and business administrator focused in the area of pulmonary and critical care medicine.  She is now an emeritus professor at the University of Alabama at Birmingham School of Medicine.

Career
Dunlap has held numerous appointments with increasing responsibilities at the University of Alabama at Birmingham, as professor of medicine and business. She also served as vice chair for clinical affairs, vice president of the UAB Health System for Ambulatory Services and chief of staff and chief operating officer for The Kirklin Clinic, a large, multi-specialty, academic clinic.

As a Robert Wood Johnson Health Policy Fellow, Dunlap worked on the reauthorization of FDA legislation regarding pharmaceuticals, medical devices, biologics, as well as issues related to Medicare, Medicaid, public health, insurance matters, sustainable growth rate and medical liability.

Dr. Dunlap was also a Physician-in-Residence with the National Governors Association in Washington, DC in 2013.

In May 2013, Dunlap was appointed interim Dean for the University of Virginia School of Medicine, replacing Steven T. DeKosky, and served a term of eighteen months.

Dunlap received a bachelor of arts degree from Wellesley College; a medical degree from Duke University; a doctoral degree in microbiology from UAB; and an MBA degree with distinction from the University of Michigan at Ann Arbor.

Publications
Dr. Dunlap is cited as an author on over 45 PubMed publications.

Board certifications
 1984, American Board of Internal Medicine
 1988, American Board of Internal Medicine, Pulmonary Diseases
 1989, 1999, 2009, American Board of Internal Medicine, Critical Care Medicine

Education
 Medical School:  Duke University Medical School, Durham, NC,
 Internship:  University of Alabama – Birmingham, 1981–1982
 Residency:  University of Alabama – Birmingham, 1982–1984
 Fellowship:  University of Alabama – Birmingham, 1984–1987
 Doctorate:  University of Alabama at Birmingham, Birmingham, AL, Ph.D., Microbiology, 1991
 Masters:  University of Michigan, Ann Arbor, MI, M.B.A., Business, With Distinction

References

University of Virginia School of Medicine faculty
American pulmonologists
American medical researchers
Duke University School of Medicine alumni
Living people
Ross School of Business alumni
Wellesley College alumni
People from Mountain Brook, Alabama
Year of birth missing (living people)